Toongabbie was an electoral district of the Legislative Assembly in the Australian state of New South Wales, created at the 2004 redistribution of electoral districts largely replacing the abolished district of Wentworthville. It was contested for the first time in the 2007 general election and abolished in the 2013 redistribution, largely replaced by Seven Hills. Its only member was the former Premier of New South Wales Nathan Rees from the Labor Party.

Members for Toongabbie

Election results

References

External links

Former electoral districts of New South Wales
Constituencies established in 2007
2007 establishments in Australia
Constituencies disestablished in 2015
2015 disestablishments in Australia